Accor Stadium may refer to:

Accor Arena, Paris
Stadium Australia, Sydney